Prospect Peak may refer to:

  Prospect Peak (California), United States
 Prospect Peak (Bonner County, Idaho), USA
 Prospect Peak (Gem County, Idaho), USA
 Prospect Peak (Latah County, Idaho), USA
 Prospect Peak (Madison County, Idaho), USA
 Prospect Peak (Montana), USA
 Prospect Peak (Elko County, Nevada), USA
 Prospect Peak (Eureka County, Nevada), USA
 Prospect Peak (Park County, Wyoming), USA
 Prospect Peak (Sublette County, Wyoming), USA
 Prospect Peak (Washington), USA